Larry Meistrich (born October 14, 1966) is an American film producer.  He was a founding member of the now defunct film production company The Shooting Gallery.
Meistrich attended Johns Hopkins University graduating in 1989 with a degree in writing. While at Hopkins, he was a brother of Alpha Delta Phi. 
He produced Sling Blade, with Billy Bob Thornton, which won the Academy Award for Best Writing, Adapted Screenplay. He won an Independent Spirit Award for producing You Can Count on Me in 2001 and the film was also nominated for an Academy Award for Best Screenplay. Meistrich now is the founder and chairman of NEHST Studios. NEHST has combined with another studio to create DigiNext Films.

Larry Meistrich has had some controversial film companies and been sued multiple times for fraud.

Selected filmography as a producer
Laws of Gravity (1992)
New Jersey Drive (1995)
Sling Blade (1996)
Henry Fool (1997)
Niagara, Niagara (1997)
Belly (1998)
Strangeland (1998)
Frogs for Snakes (1998)
The Minus Man (1999)
The 24 Hour Woman (1999)
The Bumblebee Flies Anyway (1999)
You Can Count on Me (2000)
The Tic Code (2000)
Chinese Coffee (2000)
Daddy and Them (2001)
The Numbers (2005)
Mechina: A Preparation (2005)
Article 32 (2009)

Selected filmography as a distributor 
 The Song of the Little Road (2003)
 41 (2007)
 Intervention (2007)
 Running the Sahara (2007)
 Faded Glory (2009)
 The Mayor of Strawberry Fields (2009)
 Article 32 (2009)
 Chloe and Keith's Wedding (2009)
 Running America (2009)
 The 904: Shadow on the Sunshine State (2010)
 Cut Poison Burn (2010)
 Standing Silent (2011)
 Lilith (2011)
 Thank You For Judging (2011)
 The Standbys (2012)
 Kinderblock 66: Return to the Buchenwald (2012)
 The United States of Football (2013)
 A Miracle in Spanish Harlem (2013)
 Mr. Sophistication (2013)
 The American Nurse (2014)
 Anita B. (2014)
 Drunktown's Finest (2014)
 African Exodus (2014)
 Elephant Blues (2014)
 Pass the Light (2015)
 Leaves of the Tree (2016)

References

External links
 
 

1966 births
Film producers from New York (state)
American film studio executives
Living people
People from the Bronx